Andrews Creek is a glacial meltwater stream which flows south along the east margin of Canada Glacier into the west end of Lake Fryxell, in Taylor Valley, Victoria Land. The name was suggested by hydrologist Diane McKnight, leader of a United States Geological Survey (USGS) team which made extensive studies of the hydrology and geochemistry of streams and ponds in the Lake Fryxell basin, 1987–94. Named after USGS hydrologist Edmund Andrews, a member of the field team who studied glacier hydrology during the 1987–88 and 1991–92 summer seasons.

References
 

Rivers of Victoria Land
McMurdo Dry Valleys